The Darul Ridzuan Museum is a museum in Ipoh, Kinta District, Perak, Malaysia.

History
The museum building was originally constructed in 1926 as a house for a wealthy tin miner named Foo Choong Kit. In 1950, the house was sold to Perak Government in which it was then used to house the administrative center of the Department of Works It was then opened as a museum in 1992.

Architecture
The museum building was constructed with British architectural style. It has two floors with eight rooms on the top floor and two rooms on the ground floor. Behind the main building there are another four rooms. It has a total floor area of 1.6 hectares.

Exhibitions
The museum exhibits the history and development of the mining and agriculture sectors of Ipoh.

See also
 List of museums in Malaysia
 List of tourist attractions in Perak

References

External links
 

1992 establishments in Malaysia
Buildings and structures in Ipoh
Museums established in 1992
Museums in Perak